Ambient Dub Volume II: Dead Slow is the second album by American composer Bill Laswell to be issued under the moniker Divination. It was released in 1993 by Subharmonic. The album is 61:38 minutes in length.

Track listing

Personnel 
Adapted from the Ambient Dub Volume II liner notes.

Musicians
Jeff Bova – keyboards, effects
Mick Harris – voice and effects (6)
Bill Laswell – bass guitar, effects, editing
Robert Musso – electronics, engineering
Jah Wobble – bass guitar, effects

Technical
Oz Fritz – additional engineering
Imad Mansour – assistant engineer
Thi-Linh Le – photography
Howie Weinberg – mastering

Release history

References

External links 
 
 Ambient Dub Volume II: Dead Slow at Bandcamp

1993 albums
Bill Laswell albums
Subharmonic (record label) albums
Albums produced by Bill Laswell